In abstract algebra, the term associator is used in different ways as a measure of the non-associativity of an algebraic structure. Associators are commonly studied as triple systems.

Ring theory

For a non-associative ring or algebra , the associator is the multilinear map  given by

Just as the commutator 

 

For an associative ring or algebra the associator is identically zero.

The associator in any ring obeys the identity

The associator is alternating precisely when  is an alternative ring.

The associator is symmetric in its two rightmost arguments when  is a pre-Lie algebra.

The nucleus is the set of elements that associate with all others: that is, the n in R such that

The nucleus is an associative subring of R.

Quasigroup theory

A quasigroup Q is a set with a binary operation  such that for each a, b in Q,
the equations  and  have unique solutions x, y in Q. In a quasigroup Q, the 
associator is the map  defined by the equation

for all a,b,c in Q. As with its ring theory analog, the quasigroup associator is a measure of nonassociativity of Q.

Higher-dimensional algebra

In higher-dimensional algebra, where there may be non-identity morphisms between algebraic expressions, an associator is an isomorphism

Category theory
In category theory, the associator expresses the associative properties of the internal product functor in monoidal categories.

See also 

Commutator
Non-associative algebra
 Quasi-bialgebra – discusses the Drinfeld associator

References
 
 

Non-associative algebra